Ricardo Marquez Flores (born 16 June 1943) is a Peruvian businessman and former Fujimorist politician. He was First Vice President of Peru during the second term of Alberto Fujimori between 28 July 1995 and 28 July 2000, and later served as Second Vice President of Peru during Fujimori's brief third term from 28 July 2000, until the resignation of Fujimori on 21 November 2000.

Early life and career
He was born to María Esther Flores Lozano de Marquez. He studied at the Leoncio Prado Military College in the La Perla-Callao district, and later studied Industrial Engineering at New York University.

He was Vice President of the National Confederation of Private Business Institutions (CONFIEP). From 1993 to 1994, he served as the president of the National Society of Industries.

Political career

First Vice President (1995–2000) 
In the 1995 general elections, he ran for First Vice President, in the presidential ticket of then-president Alberto Fujimori, who triumphed in his first re-election. Márquez was commissioned to launch a five-year export promotion plan, the goal of which was to turn Peru into a vigorous export economy.

In April 1996, the government created the Export Promotion Commission (Prompex), which was chaired by Márquez.

He was President of the Center for the Promotion of Small and Micro-enterprises (PROMPYME).

Second Vice President (Jul-Nov 2000) 
In the 2000 general elections, he switched to the second vice presidency, in the Peru 2000 ticket headed by Fujimori, who again triumphed in his second re-election for a third term, amid discontent among a large part of the population.

When Fujimori resigned and along with his first vice president Francisco Tudela who has broken with Fujimori a few days earlier, it was up to Márquez to assume the presidency as second vice president, according to the Constitution. However, Congress refuse to recognize him as the new President of Peru, because he was an ardent Fujimori ally and instead, he choose to resign which was accepted by the Congress on 22 November 2000.

Post-vice presidency 
Márquez did not return to participate in politics and rather focused on forming a business career instead. In 2018, Marquez Flores again assumed the presidency of the National Society of Industries.

References

Vice presidents of Peru
Fujimorista politicians
1943 births
Living people
New York University alumni